The  was an unsuccessful attempt by the Nakajima Aircraft Company to interest the  Imperial Japanese Army Air Force in a two-seat modern monoplane fighter.

Design & Development
Development of the Ki-8, (a.k.a. Nakajima DF), began in 1933, based on an all-metal two-seat aircraft, featuring low inverted gull wings, with fixed and spatted landing gear, powered by a single  Nakajima Kotobuki Ha-1-3 radial engine. Proposed armament consisted of twin 7.7 mm (.303 in) machine guns firing from between the engine cylinders and a third 7.7 mm (.303 in) machine gun on a flexible mount on the back of the rear cockpit.

In initial testing, the aircraft proved unpopular with test pilots, who raised concerns about the design's aerodynamic stability . The initial prototypes were also plagued with a variety of manufacturing defects and malfunctions. Though corrections were made to improve initial design and stability problems, the performance of the aircraft was considered no better than the existing Nakajima Type 91 fighter, and as the Japanese Army Air Force had no use for two-seat fighters, the project was cancelled in 1934, after five prototype aircraft had been produced, and before the start of full production.

Variants
Nakajima Ki-8 : initial prototype (five built)

Operators

 Imperial Japanese Army Air Force

Specifications (Ki-8)

References

Citations

Bibliography

Low-wing aircraft
Inverted gull-wing aircraft
1930s Japanese experimental aircraft
Abandoned military aircraft projects of Japan
Ki-08, Nakajima
Ki-008
Single-engined tractor aircraft